The Melbourne Theatre Company is a theatre company based in Melbourne, Victoria, Australia. Founded in 1953 as the Union Theatre Repertory Company at the Union Theatre at the University of Melbourne, it is the oldest professional theatre company in Australia.

The company's Southbank Theatre houses the 500-seat Sumner and the 150-seat Lawler, and the company also performs in the Arts Centre Melbourne's Fairfax Studio and Playhouse, all located in Melbourne's Arts Precinct in Southbank.  Considered Victoria's state theatre company, it formally comes under the auspices of the University of Melbourne. As of 2013 it offered a Mainstage Season of ten to twelve plays each year, as well as education, family and creative development activities, and reported having a subscriber base of approximately 20,000 people and played to a around quarter of a million people annually.

History
The Melbourne Theatre Company was founded in 1953 by John Sumner as the Union Theatre Repertory Company, based at the Union Theatre of the University of Melbourne's Student Union building. Sumner's original idea was to present a season of plays over those months when the Union Theatre was not being used by student drama societies. It was Australia's first professional repertory theatre, presenting a new play every two weeks during the season. Later, that became three weekly repertory. The first play, Jean Anouilh's Colombe, opened on 31 August 1953, starring Zoe Caldwell (who was later to have considerable success on Broadway), George Fairfax and Alex Scott.

Over the years, Melbourne Theatre Company has championed Australian writing, introducing the works of writers such as Alan Seymour, Vance Palmer, Patrick White, Alan Hopgood, Alexander Buzo, David Williamson, John Romeril, Jim McNeil, Alma De Groen, John Powers, Matt Cameron, Ron Elisha, Justin Fleming, Janis Bolodis, Hannie Rayson, Louis Nowra, Michael Gurr, Jack Davis, Michael Gow and Joanna Murray-Smith (to mention only a few) to mainstream Melbourne audiences. The first Australian play produced by the company, Summer of the Seventeenth Doll by Ray Lawler, in 1955 was quickly recognised as an Australian classic.

Lawler had by that time succeeded Sumner as Director of the company, taking it through the 1955 and 1956 seasons. When Lawler left to perform The Doll in London, he handed the directorship to Wal Cherry, who oversaw the company from 1956 until 1959. Cherry's experimental and daring approach to theatre did much to broaden the tastes of Melbourne theatre-goers, though the company suffered at the box-office. In 1959, John Sumner returned and subsequently steered the company through twenty-eight years of growth, watching it become, by the time he retired in 1987, the largest theatre company in Australia. Since then the company has had three artistic directors: Roger Hodgman (1987–1999), who steered MTC through the financially troublesome period of the late 1980s and 1990s; Simon Phillips, who was Artistic Director from 2000–2011; and Brett Sheehy from 2012. Robyn Nevin, Pamela Rabe, and Aidan Fennessy managed the 2012 season in the interim between Phillips and Sheehy.

Fennessy was Associate Director for some time.

The Melbourne Theatre Company has performed in many Melbourne venues in its history, including the Russell Street Theatre, the Melbourne Athenaeum, St Martins Theatre, the Merlyn and Beckett Theatres at the Malthouse, the Playhouse and Fairfax Studio of the Arts Centre Melbourne, the Comedy Theatre and the Princess Theatre.

Artistic Directors
1953–1955 John Sumner
1955–1956 Ray Lawler
1956–1959 Wal Cherry
1959–1987 John Sumner
1959–1987 John Sumner
1987–1999 Roger Hodgman
2000–2011 Simon Phillips
2012 Robyn Nevin, Pamela Rabe, Aidan Fennessy
2013–2022 Brett Sheehy
2023– Anne-Louise Sarks

Awards and nominations

Helpmann Awards
The Helpmann Awards is an awards show, celebrating live entertainment and performing arts in Australia, presented by industry group Live Performance Australia since 2001. Note: 2020 and 2021 were cancelled due to the COVID-19 pandemic.
 

! 
|-
| rowspan="7"| 2001
| Life After George (Melbourne Theatre Company)
| rowspan="2"| Helpmann Award for Best Play
| 
| rowspan="7"|
|-
| Art (Melbourne Theatre Company)
| 
|-
| Simon Phillips – Measure for Measure (Melbourne Theatre Company)
| Helpmann Award for Best Direction of a Play
| 
|-
| Caroline O’Conner – Piaf (Melbourne Theatre Company)
| Helpmann Award for Best Female Actor in a Play
| 
|-
| John Gaden – The Unexpected Man (Company B Belvoir and Melbourne Theatre Company)
| Helpmann Award for Best Male Actor in a Play
| 
|-
| Company (Melbourne Theatre Company)
| Helpmann Award for Best Musical
| 
|-
| Dale Ferguson – Trelawny of the 'Wells''' (Melbourne Theatre Company)
| Helpmann Award for Best Costume Design
| 
|-
| rowspan="3"| 2002
| The Tempest (Melbourne Theatre Company)
| Best Play
| 
| rowspan="3"|
|-
| Caroline O'Connor - Bombshells (Melbourne Theatre Company)
| Best Female Actor in a Play
| 
|-
| Dale Ferguson – The Seagull (Melbourne Theatre Company)
| Best Scenic Design
| 
|-
| rowspan="4"| 2003
| Simon Phillips – The Blue Room (Melbourne Theatre Company)
| rowspan="2"| Best Direction of a Play
| 
| rowspan="4"| 
|-
| Simon Phillips – Great Expectations| 
|-
| Rachael Griffiths -  Proof (Melbourne Theatre Company)
| Best Female Actor in a Play
| 
|-
| Christopher Gabardi – Cloud Nine (Melbourne Theatre Company)
| Helpmann Award for Best Male Actor in a Supporting Role in a Play
| 
|-
| rowspan="6"| 2004
|  Inheritance 
| rowspan="2"| Best Play
| 
| rowspan="6"|
|-
| Frozen 
| 
|-
| Julian Meyrick – Frozen (Melbourne Theatre Company)
| Best Direction of a Play
| 
|-
| Helen Morse – Frozen (Melbourne Theatre Company)
| Best Female Actor in a Play
| 
|-
| Frank Gallacher – Frozen (Melbourne Theatre Company)
| Best Male Actor in a Play
| 
|-
|Belinda McClory – Frozen (Melbourne Theatre Company)
| Best Female Actor in a Supporting Role in a Play
| 
|-
| rowspan="5"| 2005
|  The Sapphires 
| Best Play
| 
| rowspan="5"| 
|-
| Pamela Rabe – Dinner (Melbourne Theatre Company)
| Best Female Actor in a Play
| 
|-
| Richard Piper – The Daylight Atheist (Melbourne Theatre Company)
| Best Male Actor in a Play
| 
|-
| Urinetown, the Musical (Melbourne Theatre Company)
| Helpmann Award for Best Musical
| 
|-
| Ros Horin – Through the Wire (Performing Lines in association with Melbourne Theatre Company)
| Helpmann Award for Best New Australian Work
| 
|-
| rowspan="3"| 2006
| Simon Phillips – King Lear (Melbourne Theatre Company)
| Best Direction in a PLay
| 
| rowspan="3"|  
|-
| Hamish Michael – Two Brothers (Melbourne Theatre Company & Sydney Theatre Company)
| Best Male Actor in a Supporting Role in a Play
| 
|-
| The 25th Annual Putnam County Spelling Bee (Melbourne Theatre Company)
| Best Musical
| 
|-
| rowspan="3"| 2007
| Jefferson Mays – I Am My Own Wife (Melbourne Theatre Company, Sydney Theatre Company and Hothouse Theatre)
| Best Male Actor in a Play
| 
| rowspan="3"|   
|-
| Matthew Newton – The History Boys (Melbourne Theatre Company)
| Best Male Actor in a Supporting Role in a Play
| 
|-
| Dan Wyllie – The Pillowman (Melbourne Theatre Company)
| Best Male Actor in a Supporting Role in a Play
| 
|-
| rowspan="3"| 2008
| Genevieve Picot – Rock n Roll (Melbourne Theatre Company)
| Best Female Actor in a Play
| 
| rowspan="3"| 
|-
| Alison Whyte – Don's Party (Melbourne Theatre Company and Sydney Theatre Company)
| Best Female Actor in a Supporting Role in a Play
| 
|-
| Travis McMahon – Don's Party (Melbourne Theatre Company and Sydney Theatre Company)
| Best Male Actor in a Supporting Role in a Play
| 
|-
| rowspan="2"| 2009
|Peter Evans – Blackbird (Melbourne Theatre Company)
| Best Direction of a Play
| 
| rowspan="2"|
|-
| Grant Piro – Realism (Melbourne Theatre Company)
| Best Male Actor in a Supporting Role in a Play
| 
|-
| rowspan="5"| 2010
|  Richard III (Melbourne Theatre Company)
| rowspan="2"| Best Play
| 
| rowspan="5"| 
|-
| August: Osage County (Melbourne Theatre Company)
| 
|-
| Jane Menelaus – August: Osage County (Melbourne Theatre Company)
| rowspan="2"| Best Female in a Play
| 
|-
| Robyn Nevin – August: Osage County (Melbourne Theatre Company)
| 
|-
| The Drowsy Chaperone| Best Musical
| 
|-
| rowspan="5"| 2012
| The Importance of Being Earnest (Melbourne Theatre Company)
| Best Play
| 
| rowspan="5"| 
|-
|Simon Phillips – Songs for Nobodies (Melbourne Theatre Company in association with Duet)
| Best Direction of a Play
| 
|-
|Colin Friels – Red (Melbourne Theatre Company)
| Best Male Actor in a Play
| 
|-
|Bob Hornery – The Importance of Being Earnest (Melbourne Theatre Company)
| rowspan="2"| Best Male Actor in a Supporting Role in a Play
| 
|-
|Patrick Brammall – Clybourne Park (Melbourne Theatre Company)
| 
|-
| rowspan="2"| 2013
|Alison Bell – Constellations (Melbourne Theatre Company)
| Best Female Actor in a Play
| 
| rowspan="2"| 
|-
| Valerie Bader – Australia Day (Sydney Theatre Company and Melbourne Theatre Company)
| Best Female Actor in a Supporting Role in a Play
| 
|-
| rowspan="2"| 2014
|Zahra Newman – The Mountaintop (Melbourne Theatre Company)
| Best Female Actor in a Play
| 
| rowspan="2"| 
|-
| Tom Budge – The Beast (Melbourne Theatre Company)
| Best Male Actor in a Supporting Role in a Play
| 
|-
| rowspan="3"| 2015
| Clare Watson – What Rhymes with Cars and Girls (Melbourne Theatre Company)
| Best Direction of a Play
| 
| rowspan="3"| 
|-
| Julie Forsyth – Endgame (Melbourne Theatre Company)
| Best Female Actor in a Supporting Role in a Play
| 
|-
| Damien Millar – Marlin (Arena Theatre Company and Melbourne Theatre Company)
| Best New Australian Work
| 
|-
| rowspan="3"|2016
|North by Northwest (Melbourne Theatre Company and Kay + McLean Productions)
| Best Play
| 
| rowspan="3"| 
|-
| Mark Leonard Winter – Birdland (Melbourne Theatre Company)
| Best Male Actor in a Play
| 
|-
| Katrina Milosevic – The Distance (Melbourne Theatre Company)
| Best Female Actor in a Supporting Role in a Play
| 
|-
| rowspan="2"| 2017
|  Jasper Jones (Melbourne Theatre Company)
| Best Play
| 
| rowspan="2"| 
|-
| Helen Morse – John (Melbourne Theatre Company)
| Best Female Actor in a Play
| 
|-
| rowspan="7"| 2018
| The Children – (Melbourne Theatre Company and Sydney Theatre Company)
| Best Play
| 
| rowspan="7"| 
|-
| Sarah Goodes - The Children – (Melbourne Theatre Company and Sydney Theatre Company)
| Best Direction
| 
|-
| Pamela Rabe – The Children – (Melbourne Theatre Company and Sydney Theatre Company)
| rowspan="2"| Best Female Actor in a Play
| 
|-
| Sarah Peirse – The Children – (Melbourne Theatre Company and Sydney Theatre Company)
| 
|-
| John Bell – The Father (Sydney Theatre Company and Melbourne Theatre Company)
| Best Male Actor in a Play
| 
|-
| Jane Montgomery-Griffiths – Macbeth (Melbourne Theatre Company)
| Best Female Actor in a Supporting Role in a Play
| 
|-
|Bunny Christie –  The Curious Incident of the Dog in the Night-Time (National Theatre, Melbourne Theatre Company and Arts Centre Melbourne)
| Best Scenic Design
| 
|-
| rowspan="3"| 2019
| Melita Jurisic – Arbus & West (Melbourne Theatre Company)
| Best Female Actor in a Play
| 
| rowspan="3"| 
|-
| Zoe Terakes – A View from the Bridge (Melbourne Theatre Company)
| Best Female Actor in a Supporting Role in a Play
| 
|-
| Kate Miller-Heidke & Keir Nuttall – Twelfth Night'' (Melbourne Theatre Company)
| Helpmann Award for Best  Original Score
| 
|}

References

Bibliography
 Geoffrey Hutton (1975). "It won't last a week!": the first twenty years of the Melbourne Theatre Company. Melbourne: Macmillan. .
 Julian Meyrick, ed. (2004). The Drama Continues: MTC the first fifty years 1953–2003. Southbank: Melbourne Theatre Company. .

External links

1953 establishments in Australia
Theatre companies in Australia
Landmarks in Melbourne
Theatre in Melbourne
Organisations based in Melbourne